The men's 1500 metres event at the 2015 European Athletics Indoor Championships was held on 6 March at 18:00 (heats) and on 7 March at 16:30 (final) local time.

Medalists

Results

Heats
Qualification: First 2 of each heat (Q) and the next 1 fastest (q) qualified for the final.

Final

References

2015 European Athletics Indoor Championships
1500 metres at the European Athletics Indoor Championships